Waiting for a Miracle is the debut album by The Comsat Angels, released 5 September 1980 on Polydor Records.

History
The entire album was recorded in 10 days. Frontman Stephen Fellows explained how they were able to accomplish this: "We were totally organised. Arrangements, tempos and all the lyrics were sorted out before we went in." But he wasn't quite happy with everything, and in a 2002 interview, said, "The thing that bugs me most about the [early] records is my singing, particularly on the first album. I wish I'd sung more before we made that." The cover photograph was taken by Martyn Goddard at Sheffield Parkway, Sheffield.

Release
Although the album's sales were mediocre, it was well received by critics.

Compact disc versions
The album was not issued on CD until 15 years after its initial vinyl release. It has been reissued on CD three times, in 1995 by RPM Records, in 2006 by Renascent and in 2015 by Edsel Records, with different track listings (see below). Two singles were taken from Waiting for a Miracle: "Total War" and "Independence Day" (the latter released on July 4).

Vinyl track listing (1980)

CD track listing (1995)

CD track listing (2006)

CD track listing (2015) 
All tracks written by Fellows/Glaisher/Bacon/Peake

CD 1

Bonus Tracks

CD 2

John Peel Sessions

Personnel
The Comsat Angels
 Stephen Fellows - vocals, guitar
 Andy Peake - synthesizer, vocals
 Kevin Bacon - bass guitar
 Mik Glaisher - drums

References

1980 debut albums
The Comsat Angels albums
Polydor Records albums